Rustam Murzagalyiev (born 24 May 1992) is a Kazakh professional basketball player, currently with BC Astana of the VTB United League and the Kazakhstan Basketball Championship.

He represented Kazakhstan's national basketball team at the 2017 FIBA Asia Cup in Zouk Mikael, Lebanon, where he was Kazakhstan's best 3 point shooter.

References

External links
 FIBA profile
 Profile at 2017 FIBA Asia Champions Cup 
 Asia-basket.com profile

1992 births
Living people
Asian Games competitors for Kazakhstan
Basketball players at the 2014 Asian Games
Basketball players at the 2018 Asian Games
BC Astana players
Guards (basketball)
Kazakhstani men's basketball players
People from Shymkent